William Macrow (7 July 1889 – 19 May 1970) was an Australian cricketer. He played five first-class cricket matches for Victoria between 1911 and 1913.

See also
 List of Victoria first-class cricketers

References

External links
 

1889 births
1970 deaths
Australian cricketers
Victoria cricketers
Cricketers from Melbourne